Posle mene što ti e gajle (After Me What Do You Care?) is the first and only album by Badmingtons. It was released in 1985.

It is now out of print and very hard to find, although tracks 1, 4 and 5 can be streamed free of charge from the Badmingtons MySpace page.

Tracks 1, 4 and 5 were recorded in 1985 after Badmingtons won a battle of the bands contest. The rest of the tracks are from the demo tape Badmingtons sent to Radio-Televizija Skopje to enter the contest. Track 1 became the most popular Badmingtons track.

In 2007, the tracks recorded as Badmingtons' prize were made available on MySpace and a video was made for "Moram li jas".

Other than the copy scanned in by Badmingtons and the Discogs user "maximumrocknroll" claiming to have this album, very little is known about this album. According to the back of the sleeve, only 30 copies were made.

Track list

References

External links 
 Posle mene što ti e gajle on Discogs

1985 albums